Allium pervestitum is a species of wild garlic in the family Amaryllidaceae, usually found growing in the coastal area of the Sea of Azov. It is a halophyte.

References

pervestitum
Halophytes
Flora of Ukraine
Flora of the Crimean Peninsula
Flora of South European Russia
Plants described in 1950